Saint Crispin's Day, or the Feast of Saint Crispin, falls on 25 October and is the feast day of the Christian saints Crispin and Crispinian, twins who were martyred c. 286.   They are both the patron saints of cobblers, leather workers, tanners, saddlers and glove, lace and shoe makers (among other professions).

In modern times, the feast day is best known with reference to the St Crispin's Day Speech in Shakespeare's play Henry V. A scene in the play recounts the Battle of Agincourt, which took place on Saint Crispin's Day in 1415, with the titular character giving a speech before the battle referencing the feast day. 

Other significant battles have taken place on St Crispin's Day, including the fall of Lisbon in 1147, the Battle of Balaclava (featuring the Charge of the Light Brigade) in 1854, and the Battle of Leyte Gulf in the Pacific theatre in 1944.

Feast day
The feast day of Saints Crispin and Crispinian is 25 October. Although this feast was removed from the Roman Catholic Church's universal liturgical calendar following the Second Vatican Council, the two saints are still commemorated on that day in the most recent edition of the Roman Martyrology. The feast remains as a "Black Letter Saints' Day" in the calendar of the Anglican Book of Common Prayer (1662) and a "commemoration" in Common Worship (2000).

Agincourt
The Battle of Agincourt was dramatised by William Shakespeare in Henry V featuring the battle in which Henry inspired his much-outnumbered English forces to fight the French through a St Crispin's Day Speech, saying "the fewer men, the greater share of honour". The main part of the speech begins "This day is called the feast of Crispian", and goes on to say that each soldier who survives the battle, will, each year, "rouse him at the name of Crispian" and say "'These wounds I had on Crispin's day'", and:
Crispin Crispian shall ne'er go by,
From this day to the ending of the world,
But we in it shall be rememberèd;
We few, we happy few, we band of brothers.

Other battles
When the Battle of Balaclava was fought on the 25 October 1854, the coincidence was noticed by contemporaries, who used Shakespeare's words to comment on the battle. The contrast between the two battles, one a complete victory, the other indecisive and notorious for the disastrous Charge of the Light Brigade, has also been noted. The Battle of Shangani (1893) in the First Matabele War was also fought on that date.
  
Several battles of World War II were fought on St Crispin's Day. In 1942, this day was the third day of the Second Battle of El Alamein, and, on the other side of the world, the Battle of Henderson Field was fought at Guadalcanal.  Two years later, in 1944, the Battle of Leyte Gulf was being fought at Cape Engaño, Samar Island and in the Straits of Surigao; in the latter, the Japanese fleet was effectively destroyed.

Other battles have also been fought on the day, but were not associated with its symbolism at the time. In 1315, a century before Agincourt, Adam Banastre, Henry de Lea and William Bradshaw, led an attack on Liverpool Castle. An early battle of the American Civil War, the First Battle of Springfield, Missouri, was fought on October 25, 1861, and was a Union victory.  Another forgotten battle in that war, the Battle of Marais des Cygnes, Kansas (Mine Creek), was fought on that day in 1864.

References

October observances
Crispin